Kolomak is an urban-type settlement in Bohodukhiv Raion, Kharkiv Oblast, Ukraine. It hosts the administration of Kolomak settlement hromada, one of the hromadas of Ukraine. Population: 

Kolomak is located between Poltava and Kharkiv, on both banks of the Kolomak River, a major left tributary of the Vorskla in the drainage basin of the Dnieper.

History 
It was a village in Valky uyezd of Kharkov Governorate of the Russian Empire.

During World War II it was under German occupation from October 1941 to September 1943.

In January 1989 the population was 4628 people. In January 2013 the population was 3844 people.

Until 18 July 2020, Kolomak was the administrative center of Kolomak Raion. The raion was abolished in July 2020 as part of the administrative reform of Ukraine, which reduced the number of raions of Kharkiv Oblast to seven. The area of Kolomak Raion was merged into Bohodukhiv Raion.

Economy

Transportation
There are local roads as well.

There is a freight dead-end railway line to Kolomak from Vodiana railway station, on the same line connecting Kharkiv and Poltava.

People from Kolomak 
 Pavlo Pokhytaylo (born 1995), Ukrainian footballer

References

Urban-type settlements in Bohodukhiv Raion
Bohodukhiv Raion
Valkovsky Uyezd